The Late Cretaceous (100.5–66 Ma) is the younger of two epochs into which the Cretaceous Period is divided in the geologic time scale. Rock strata from this epoch form the Upper Cretaceous Series. The Cretaceous is named after  creta, the Latin word for the white limestone known as chalk. The chalk of northern France and the white cliffs of south-eastern England date from the  Cretaceous Period.

Climate
During the Late Cretaceous, the climate was warmer than present, although throughout the period a cooling trend is evident. The tropics became restricted to equatorial regions and northern latitudes experienced markedly more seasonal climatic conditions.

Geography

Due to plate tectonics, the Americas were gradually moving westward, causing the Atlantic Ocean to expand. The Western Interior Seaway divided North America into eastern and western halves; Appalachia and Laramidia. India maintained a northward course towards Asia. In the Southern Hemisphere, Australia and Antarctica seem to have remained connected and began to drift away from Africa and South America. Europe was an island chain. Populating some of these islands were endemic dwarf dinosaur species.

Vertebrate fauna

Non-avian dinosaurs

In the Late Cretaceous, the hadrosaurs, ankylosaurs, and ceratopsians experienced success in Asiamerica (Western North America and eastern Asia). Tyrannosaurs dominated the large predator niche in North America. They were also present in Asia, although were usually smaller and more primitive than the North American varieties. Pachycephalosaurs were also present in both North America and Asia. Dromaeosaurids shared the same geographical distribution, and are well documented in both Mongolia and Western North America. Additionally therizinosaurs (known previously as segnosaurs) appear to have been in North America and Asia. Gondwana held a very different dinosaurian fauna, with most predators being abelisaurids and carcharodontosaurids; and titanosaurs being among the dominant herbivores.
Spinosaurids were also present during this time.

Birds
Birds became increasingly common, diversifying in a variety of enantiornithe and ornithurine forms. Early Neornithes such as Vegavis co-existed with forms as bizarre as Yungavolucris and Avisaurus. Though mostly small, marine Hesperornithes became relatively large and flightless, adapted to life in the open sea.

Pterosaurs
Though primarily represented by azhdarchids, other forms like pteranodontids, tapejarids (Caiuajara and Bakonydraco), nyctosaurids and uncertain forms (Piksi, Navajodactylus) are also present. Historically, it has been assumed that pterosaurs were in decline due to competition with birds, but it appears that neither group overlapped significantly ecologically, nor is it particularly evident that a true systematic decline was ever in place, especially with the discovery of smaller pterosaur species.

Mammals
Several old mammal groups began to disappear, with the last eutriconodonts occurring in the Campanian of North America. In the northern hemisphere, cimolodont, multituberculates, metatherians and eutherians were the dominant mammals, with the former two groups being the most common mammals in North America. In the southern hemisphere there was instead a more complex fauna of dryolestoids, gondwanatheres and other multituberculates and basal eutherians; monotremes were presumably present, as was the last of the haramiyidans, Avashishta.

Mammals, though generally small, ranged into a variety of ecological niches, from carnivores (Deltatheroida), to mollusc-eater (Stagodontidae), to herbivores (multituberculates, Schowalteria, Zhelestidae and Mesungulatidae) to highly atypical cursorial forms (Zalambdalestidae, Brandoniidae).

True placentals evolved only at the very end of the epoch; the same can be said for true marsupials. Instead, nearly all known eutherian and metatherian fossils belong to other groups.

Marine life
In the seas, mosasaurs suddenly appeared and underwent a spectacular evolutionary radiation. Modern sharks also appeared and penguin-like polycotylid plesiosaurs (3 meters long) and huge long-necked elasmosaurs (13 meters long) also diversified. These predators fed on the numerous teleost fishes, which in turn evolved into new advanced and modern forms (Neoteleostei). Ichthyosaurs and pliosaurs, on the other hand, became extinct during the Cenomanian-Turonian anoxic event.

Flora
Near the end of the Cretaceous Period, flowering plants diversified. In temperate regions, familiar plants like magnolias, sassafras, roses, redwoods, and willows could be found in abundance.

Cretaceous–Paleogene mass extinction discovery

It is widely known as the K–T extinction event and is associated with a geological signature, usually a thin band dated to that time and found in various parts of the world, known as the Cretaceous–Paleogene boundary (K–T boundary). K is the traditional abbreviation for the Cretaceous Period derived from the German name Kreidezeit, and T is the abbreviation for the Tertiary Period (a historical term for the period of time now covered by the Paleogene and Neogene periods). The event marks the end of the Mesozoic Era and the beginning of the Cenozoic Era. "Tertiary" being no longer recognized as a formal time or rock unit by the International Commission on Stratigraphy, the K-T event is now called the Cretaceous—Paleogene (or K-Pg) extinction event by many researchers.

Non-avian dinosaur fossils are found only below the Cretaceous–Paleogene boundary and became extinct immediately before or during the event. A very small number of dinosaur fossils have been found above the Cretaceous–Paleogene boundary, but they have been explained as reworked fossils, that is, fossils that have been eroded from their original locations then preserved in later sedimentary layers.  Mosasaurs, plesiosaurs, pterosaurs and many species of plants and invertebrates also became extinct.  Mammalian and bird clades passed through the boundary with few extinctions, and evolutionary radiation from those Maastrichtian clades occurred well past the boundary.  Rates of extinction and radiation varied across different clades of organisms.

Many scientists hypothesize that the Cretaceous–Paleogene extinctions were caused by catastrophic events such as the massive asteroid impact that caused the Chicxulub crater, in combination with increased volcanic activity, such as that recorded in the Deccan Traps, both of which have been firmly dated to the time of the extinction event. In theory, these events reduced sunlight and hindered photosynthesis, leading to a massive disruption in Earth's ecology. A much smaller number of researchers believe the extinction was more gradual, resulting from slower changes in sea level or climate.

See also
 Flora and fauna of the Maastrichtian stage
 Hațeg Island

References

 
 Late
Geological epochs